The 49th Writers Guild of America Awards, given on 16 March 1997, honored the best writers of screen and television of 1996.

Film

Best Original Screenplay
  Fargo - Joel and Ethan Coen
Jerry Maguire - Cameron Crowe
Lone Star - John Sayles
Secrets & Lies - Mike Leigh
Shine - Jan Sardi and Scott Hicks

Best Adapted Screenplay
 Sling Blade - Billy Bob Thornton
Emma - Douglas McGrath
The Birdcage - Elaine May
The English Patient - Anthony Minghella
Trainspotting - John Hodge

Television

Best Episodic Drama
 Girl Talk - NYPD Blue - Theresa Rebeck and Bill Clark
Aftershock - Law & Order - Janis Diamond and Michael S. Chernuchin
Savages - Law & Order - Morgan Gendel, Barry M. Schkolnick and Michael S. Chernuchin
Trophy - Law & Order - Jeremy R. Litman, Ed Zuckerman and Michael S. Chernuchin
Pilot - Murder One - Charles H. Eglee, Channing Gibson, Steven Bochco and David Milch
Falsies - Party of Five - Mark B. Perry
Clyde Bruckman's Final Repose - The X Files - Darin Morgan

Best Episodic Comedy
 The Pool Guy - Seinfeld - David Mandel
The Soup Nazi - Seinfeld - Spike Feresten
The Sponge - Seinfeld - Peter Mehlman
Eight - The Larry Sanders Show - Peter Tolan

References
WGA - Previous award winners
 

1996
Writers Guild of America
Writ
1996 in American cinema
1996 in American television
Writers Guild of America Awards